Caulfield Grammarians can refer to:

People
 Individuals who are attending, or have attended Caulfield Grammar School (see List of Caulfield Grammar School people).

Sporting
 The Caulfield Grammarians Football Club as an entity, or to its players collectively.